Rio Grande is an unincorporated community and census-designated place (CDP) located within Middle Township and Lower Township in Cape May County, New Jersey, United States.

Though for the 1990 to 2010 U.S. censuses the CDP was entirely located within Middle Township, a small section at the southern edge of the community, located in Lower Township, is sometimes called Rio Grande. For the 2020 U.S. Census the boundary was redrawn so that portions of Lower Township were included in the Rio Grande CDP.

It is part of the Ocean City Metropolitan Statistical Area. As of the 2010 United States Census, the CDP's population was 2,670.

History
According to Jeffrey M. Dorwart, Rio Grande was founded in the mid-nineteenth century around a country store owned by the Hildreth family.  The community was originally called Hildreth for that reason.

George F. Boyer and J. Pearson Cunningham explain that, during the colonial period, Aaron Leaming, the Hildreths and the Cresses had plantations in that area.  Where the King's Highway crossed the road coming from Dennisville and Goshen a stage coach terminal was set up, and the spot became the center for trade for the local farming families.  Boyer and Cunningham say that the area was known as "Leamings," for the prominent landholders, or as "Hildreth," the family who ran the local store.  (p. 121-122)  They continue, "The name, Rio Grande, was suggested by the seventh Aaron Leaming who thought this southern United States river had an attractive sound."

Geography
According to the United States Census Bureau, the CDP had a total area of 2.490 square miles (6.450 km2), including 2.459 square miles (6.369 km2) of land and 0.031 square miles (0.081 km2) of water (1.26%).

Climate

The climate in this area is characterized by hot, humid summers and generally mild to cool winters.  According to the Köppen Climate Classification system, Rio Grande has a humid subtropical climate, abbreviated "Cfa" on climate maps.

Demographics

Census 2010

Census 2000
As of the 2000 United States Census there were 2,444 people, 1,029 households, and 658 families living in the CDP. The population density was 399.8/km2 (1,036.8/mi2). There were 1,294 housing units at an average density of 211.7/km2 (548.9/mi2). The racial makeup of the CDP was 90.79% White, 4.50% African American, 0.29% Native American, 0.94% Asian, 1.10% from other races, and 2.37% from two or more races. Hispanic or Latino of any race were 3.03% of the population.

There were 1,029 households, out of which 25.5% had children under the age of 18 living with them; 46.6% were married couples living together; 13.6% had a female householder with no husband present; and 36.0% were non-families. 30.1% of all households were made up of individuals, and 15.4% had someone living alone who was 65 years of age or older. The average household size was 2.36 and the average family size was 2.93.

In the CDP the population was spread out, with 21.6% under the age of 18, 7.7% from 18 to 24, 26.7% from 25 to 44, 24.1% from 45 to 64, and 19.9% who were 65 years of age or older. The median age was 42 years. For every 100 females, there were 91.7 males. For every 100 females age 18 and over, there were 91.8 males.

The median income for a household in the CDP was $28,424, and the median income for a family was $38,007. Males had a median income of $32,935 versus $19,643 for females. The per capita income for the CDP was $18,792. About 20.9% of families and 21.4% of the population were below the poverty line, including 32.5% of those under age 18 and 17.9% of those age 65 or over.

Education
The areas within Middle Township, including Rio Grande CDP, are in the Middle Township Public Schools; it operates its campuses in Cape May Court House, including Middle Township High School.

The areas within Lower Township are in the Lower Township School District for elementary grades and the Lower Cape May Regional School District for secondary grades. The elementary school district operates Douglass School (PreK and Kindergarten) in Villas CDP and three schools in Cold Spring: Mitnick School (1-2), Abrams School (3-4), and Sandman School (5-6). The secondary school district Teitelman Middle School and Lower Cape May Regional High School in the Erma area.

Countywide schools include Cape May Technical High School (for technical school students) and Cape May County Special Services School District (for special needs students) in the Cape May Court House area.

In the era of de jure educational segregation in the United States, a school for white children in grades 1-6 was maintained in Rio Grande and a school for black children was maintained in Whitesboro in grades 1-8. White children in Rio Grande were sent to West Cape May School District for grades 7-12.

Transportation
Rio Grande is situated at the junction of U.S. Route 9 and Route 47. U.S. Route 9 runs south to Cape May and north toward the Atlantic City area while Route 47 runs southeast to Wildwood and north to Millville and the Camden area. Rio Grande is accessible from the Garden State Parkway at exit 4 northbound and exit 4B southbound.

NJ Transit offers bus service from Rio Grande to Cape May and Philadelphia on the 313, 315 and 316 (seasonal only) routes, to Cape May and the Port Authority Bus Terminal in Midtown Manhattan on the 319 route, to Wildwood on the 510 route, and to Cape May and Atlantic City on the 552 route.

The Great American Trolley Company operates trolley service from North Wildwood and Wildwood to shopping centers in Rio Grande on Mondays through Fridays in the summer months.

Cape May Airport, established in 1941 as NAS Rio Grande, is located in the area, in adjacent Lower Township.

Notable people

People who were born in, residents of, or otherwise closely associated with Rio Grande include:
 Jane Moffet (1930–2018), utility player who played for four seasons in the All-American Girls Professional Baseball League

Wineries and breweries
 Hawk Haven Vineyard & Winery
 7 Mile Brewery

Gallery

References

External links

 The Cape May County Gazette Local community newspaper
 The Beachcomber
 Cape May County Herald

Census-designated places in Cape May County, New Jersey
Middle Township, New Jersey
Lower Township, New Jersey